The 2000 Polish Figure Skating Championships were the Polish Figure Skating Championships of the 1999/2000 figure skating season. The Polish Championships are held annually to determine the National Champions of Poland. They were held in Warsaw, between January 14 and January 16, 2000.

Senior level results

Ladies

Judges were :
 Referee : Anna Sierocka
 Assistant Referee : Jacek Grzegrzółka
 Judge No. 1 : Aniela Hebel-Szmak
 Judge No. 2 : Tomasz Mydlarz
 Judge No. 3 : Agata Szmajchel
 Judge No. 4 : Halina Gordon
 Judge No. 5 : Danuta Dubrowko
 Judge No. 6 : Ewa Lachowicz
 Judge No. 7 : Andżelika Rzeczkowska

Men

Judges were :
 Referee : Hanna Then
 Assistant Referee : Aniela Hebel-Szmak
 Judge No. 1 : Agata Szmajchel
 Judge No. 2 : Ewa Lachowicz
 Judge No. 3 : Andżelika Rzeczkowska
 Judge No. 4 : Jacek Grzegrzółka
 Judge No. 5 : Magdalena Seredyńska
 Judge No. 6 : Tomasz Mydlarz
 Judge No. 7 : Małgorzta Sobkow

Pairs

Judges were :
 Referee : Anna Sierocka
 Assistant Referee : Danuta Dubrowko
 Judge No. 1 : Magdalena Seredyńska
 Judge No. 2 : Ewa Lachowicz
 Judge No. 3 : Halina Gordon
 Judge No. 4 : Jacek Grzegrzółka
 Judge No. 5 : Agata Szmajchel
 Judge No. 6 : Andżelika Rzeczkowska
 Judge No. 7 : Tomasz Mydlarz

Ice Dancing

Judges were :
 Referee : Maria Miller
 Assistant Referee : Agnieszka Domańska
 Judge No. 1 : Halina Gordon
 Judge No. 2 : Andrzej Alberciak
 Judge No. 3 : Małgorzta Sobkow
 Judge No. 4 : Danuta Dubrowko
 Judge No. 5 : Małgorzata Grajcar

Junior level results

Ladies

Judges were :
 Referee : Hanna Then
 Assistant Referee : Anna Sierocka
 Judge No. 1 : Tomasz Mydlarz
 Judge No. 2 : Magdalena Seredyńska
 Judge No. 3 : Ewa Lachowicz
 Judge No. 4 : Jacek Grzegrzółka
 Judge No. 5 : Aniela Hebel-Szmak
 Judge No. 6 : Andżelika Rzeczkowska
 Judge No. 7 : Agata Szmajchel

Men

Judges were :
 Referee : Anna Sierocka
 Assistant Referee : Halina Gordon
 Judge No. 1 : Tomasz Mydlarz
 Judge No. 2 : Ewa Lachowicz
 Judge No. 3 : Andżelika Rzeczkowska
 Judge No. 4 : Magdalena Seredyńska
 Judge No. 5 : Jacek Grzegrzółka
 Judge No. 6 : Maria Miller
 Judge No. 7 : Agata Szmajchel

Pairs

Judges were :
 Referee : Anna Sierocka
 Assistant Referee : Danuta Dubrowko
 Judge No. 1 : Magdalena Seredyńska
 Judge No. 2 : Ewa Lachowicz
 Judge No. 3 : Halina Gordon
 Judge No. 4 : Jacek Grzegrzółka
 Judge No. 5 : Agata Szmajchel
 Judge No. 6 : Andżelika Rzeczkowska
 Judge No. 7 : Tomasz Mydlarz

Ice Dancing

Judges were :
 Referee : Maria Miller
 Assistant Referee : Agnieszka Domańska
 Judge No. 1 : Halina Gordon
 Judge No. 2 : Andrzej Alberciak
 Judge No. 3 : Małgorzta Sobkow
 Judge No. 4 : Danuta Dubrowko
 Judge No. 5 : Małgorzata Grajcar

References
 Archive results at the Figure Skating Corner

Polish Figure Skating Championships
Polish Figure Skating Championships, 2000
Polish Figure Skating Championships, 2000